Gargi Raina is an Indian painter who lives and works in Vadodara, Gujarat.

Early life 
Gargi's family is originally from Kashmir and later settled in Lahore and then during Partition of India, they moved to Delhi. She was born in New Delhi in 1961 and received a Bachelor of Fine Arts (BFA) degree from The College of Arts, New Delhi in 1985. She further went on to get a Master of Fine Arts (MFA) in Painting from the Faculty of Fine Arts, Maharaja Sayajirao University of Baroda in 1988.

Career 
Gargi was awarded the 2002 Residency at Taipei Artists Village in Taiwan. She is represented by Bodhi Art, Gallery Threshold and Palette Art Gallery. She has also participated in Lo Real Maravilloso: Marvelous Reality, 20 Year Celebration of Gallery Espace at Lalit Kala Akademi, New Delhi, 2009.

She uses gouache and dry pastels on paper and wood, and works in sequences which follow a narrative, linear in the way it reads but elastic in the way that it enables the user to comprehend and examine the artwork.

She says, "I've been working with the idea of stretching time. It's like seeing something in slow motion or looking at one thing and stretching that time, being able to go backwards and forwards and doing it at a very, very slow pace. I think that has been very crucial to a lot of the work that I have been doing recently."

She has conducted several workshops in Gorlesborg, Sweden, the Max Mueller Bhawan in Chennai, the Khoj International Artists Workshop in Modinagar and Srinagar, South Asian Women's Peace Workshop in Lahore, Pakistan organised by Salima Hashmi and workshop at Zenana Mahal in Udaipur Palace in Rajasthan.

She works and lives in Vadodara, Gujarat.

Exhibitions

Solo exhibitions 
 Constructing the Memory of a Room, Paintings and Installations from 2001–07, Bodhi Art, New Delhi, 2007; Sakshi Gallery, Mumbai, 1999 and 1996; Faculty of Fine Arts, Maharaja Sayajirao University of Baroda, 1996; Gallery 7, Mumbai, 1992.

Group exhibitions 
 Snow, The Palette Art Gallery, New Delhi, in collaboration with Tao Art Gallery, Mumbai, 2010
 Zip Files, Tao Art Gallery, Mumbai, 2009
 Relative Visa, Bodhi Space, Mumbai, 2009
 Material/Im-mmaterial, Gallery Collection, Bodhi Art, Gurgaon, 2008
 Mapping Memories–2, Painted Travelogues of Bali and Burma, Gallery Threshold, New Delhi, 2008
 Angkor: The Silent Centuries, Gallery Threshold, New Delhi, 2005

References 

Indian women painters
20th-century Indian women artists
Indian women contemporary artists
Indian contemporary painters
Year of birth missing (living people)
Living people
Painters from Gujarat
People from Vadodara
Women artists from Gujarat
21st-century Indian women artists